Qayeh Bolaghi (also Romanized as Qayeh Bolāghī; also known as Kia Bulaq, Kiya Bulāq, and Qayeh Bolāgh) is a village in Sarajuy-ye Shomali Rural District, in the Central District of Maragheh County, East Azerbaijan Province, Iran. At the 2006 census, its population was 468, in 85 families.

References 

Towns and villages in Maragheh County